Joyland Amusement Park was a small family-owned traditional amusement park, located in Lubbock, Texas, United States within Lubbock's Mackenzie Park. It typically operated from March to September of each year, opening 6 days a week but only during the evening on weeknights.

History
The park was founded in the 1940s with the name "Mackenzie Park Playground." In 1973, it had 13 rides and was acquired by the Dean family, who renamed the park to its current name. Members of the Dean family still operate the park. Like many smaller parks it uses a mixture of individual ride admissions and pay one price admission, with patrons taking their choice. 

On September 12, 2022, The Dean Family announced that Joyland would not reopen and the park will be auctioned on October 27, 2022, if an interested party, with a viable offer, is not found by October 1, 2022. On October 21, 2022 it was announced that buyers Jim and Kai Evans along with Daryl and Stephanie Holland would reopen the park for the 2023 season. The park would not reopen in 2023 following an announcement on January 10, 2023, that buyers backed out of the purchase, and liquidation of the park would begin soon.

Layout and operation
The park was laid out linearly with a midway. Much of the midway had water sprayers overhead to mist guests, which increased guest comfort in Lubbock's hot, dry climate. There were several water rides, roller coasters and family rides.

There was a park train that ran from one end to the other, with a station near the kiddie rides as well as one at the far end of the park, done in ATSF colors, as well as a sky ride/chairlift system, with a single station, both of which allowed patrons to view the entire park.

Rides
The park had about 30 rides, including 2 roller coasters. There was an old time carousel at the park entrance which features classic advertisements on the top, as well as a selection of typical rides such as a Trabant, Scrambler, and bumper cars.

Roller coasters

Thrill rides

Family rides

Kiddie rides

The coasters of the park include:
 The Galaxi  is a (standard model with about 36 instances extant) steel coaster manufactured by S.D.C., a defunct Italian coaster manufacturer, in 1971. It was relocated from White Swan Park (Coraopolis, Pennsylvania) in 1989. It has a single train with 2 cars, 2 rows of 2 across riders per car, for a total of 8 riders.
 The Little Coaster  manufactured by Carl Miler was replaced with a Wisdom Dragon Coaster in 2016.
 Greezed Lightnin' was planned to be installed in 2006 and given a new name. After the ground was set aside, it was found to be unstable, and installation was first delayed and later cancelled. This Schwarzkopf Shuttle Looper was purchased from Astroworld in Houston, Texas. It has a single train with 7 cars, with 2 rows of 2 riders per car, for a total of 28 riders.
 For the 2010 season, Joyland added Dare Devil Drop, a  drop tower ride manufactured by Larson Int. The name Dare Devil Drop was entered in a "name the ride" contest by Wesley Orr, a fifteen-year-old resident of Leonard, Texas. Orr said he thought of the name while reading about the new Evel Knievel roller coaster opening at Six Flags St. Louis that same year. Dare Devil Drop opened on May 24, 2008.
Dipsy Doodle is the junior coaster that was replaced with the Wisdom Dragon Coaster in 2016.
In 2018, Joyland added the X-Factor Extreme. This is a pendulum-type ride and the gondolas rotate. The ride swings in a 200 degree arc giving the riders feelings of both positive and negative G-forces. With the rotation of the gondola, no two rides are alike.
 In 2019, Sand Storm, a  Cavazza Diego Blizzard model, was installed.

References

External links

Amusement parks in Texas
Economy of Lubbock, Texas
1940s establishments in Texas
2022 disestablishments in Texas
Buildings and structures in Lubbock, Texas
Defunct amusement parks in Texas

Tourist attractions in Lubbock, Texas